85 Pegasi is a multiple star system 39.5 light years away in the constellation of Pegasus. The primary component is sixth magnitude 85 Pegasi A, which is a yellow dwarf like the Sun. The secondary component, 85 Pegasi B, is a ninth magnitude orange dwarf that takes 26.28 years to orbit at 10.3 AU around the primary in an elliptical orbit. The orbital distance ranges from 6.4 AU at periastron to 14.2 AU at apastron. 85 Pegasi B may itself be a binary, with a  close, faint red dwarf companion (designated 85 Pegasi Bb) separated by 2 AU from the primary (designated 85 Pegasi Ba). The mass would be 11% solar mass. All components in the star system including Star A are smaller, cooler and less massive, luminous, and metallic than the Sun and 51 Pegasi.

An infrared excess has been detected around the primary, most likely indicating
the presence of a circumstellar disk at a radius of more than 97 AU. The temperature of this dust is below 25 K.

References

External links 
 Solstation: 85 Pegasi 3

G-type main-sequence stars
K-type main-sequence stars
M-type main-sequence stars
Pegasi, 85
Pegasus (constellation)
Triple star systems
Pegasi, 85
224930
000171
9088
0914
BD+26 4734